Malva neglecta is an annual growing to 0.6 m (2 ft). It is known as common mallow in the United States and also as buttonweed, cheeseplant, cheeseweed, dwarf mallow, and roundleaf mallow.
This plant is often consumed as a food, with its leaves, stalks and seed all being considered edible.  This is especially true of the seeds, which contain 21% protein and 15.2% fat.

Distribution
Native
Palearctic:
Macaronesia: Canary Islands
Northern Africa: Algeria, Morocco
Arabian Peninsula: Saudi Arabia
Western Asia: Afghanistan, Cyprus, Sinai, Iran, Iraq, Israel, Jordan, Lebanon, Palestinian Territories, Syria, Turkey
Caucasus: Armenia, Azerbaijan, Georgia
Soviet Middle Asia: Kazakhstan, Kyrgyzstan, Tajikistan, Turkmenistan, Uzbekistan
Mongolia: Mongolia
China: Xinjiang
Indian Subcontinent: India, Pakistan
Northern Europe: Denmark, Ireland, Norway, Sweden, United Kingdom
Middle Europe: Austria, Belgium, Czech Republic, Germany, Hungary, Netherlands, Poland, Slovakia, Switzerland
Southeastern Europe: Albania, Bosnia and Herzegovina, Bulgaria, Croatia, Greece, Italy, Montenegro, North Macedonia, Sardinia, Serbia, Slovenia, Romania,
Southwestern Europe: France, Portugal, Spain
Source:

Uses 
Leaves and young seeds can be eaten raw or cooked. Mature seeds should be cooked like rice or grains.

References

External links
 
 
 
 
 
 
 

neglecta
Edible plants
Flora of Europe
Flora of North Africa
Flora of the Canary Islands
Flora of temperate Asia
Flora of tropical Asia
Taxa named by Karl Friedrich Wilhelm Wallroth